Phoronopsis harmeri is a species of marine horseshoe worm in the phylum Phoronida.  It was first described by H.L.M. Pixell in 1912, and was found off of Vancouver Island.

Ecology
This species has been found around the world in coastal habitats.

Like other Lophophorata, P. harmeli is a filter feeder.  They have been known to various bacteria and other planktonic organisms with a size range of 1.2–12 μm.

Development
Larvae have a minor nerve ring.  During larval development, serotonin-like immunoreactive parts of the nervous system change.

References

Phoronids
Animals described in 1912